Tomasz Krystek (born 28 December 1934) was a former Polish footballer who played as a goalkeeper. He is documented to have been a part of the Lechia Gdańsk team for the 1953 I liga season. His Lechia debut came on 12 April 1943 in a 2–1 defeat to Górnik Radlin. Despite the few appearances for Lechia he has often been involved with group events regarding the football club and with higher profile players.

References

1935 births
Polish footballers
Association football goalkeepers
I liga players
Lechia Gdańsk players
Living people